Acetiromate is an antilipidemic drug which is used to treat hyperlipidemia. It is also known as Adecol, TBF 43, or acetyltriiodothyronine formic acid.

References

External links

Hypolipidemic agents
Lipid disorders